Arsos is the name of two villages in Cyprus :

Arsos, Larnaca, in Northern Cyprus
Arsos, Limassol, a village near Limassol